Vyooham is a 1990 Indian Malayalam-language action film, directed by Sangeeth Sivan, starring Raghuvaran, Sukumaran, Captain Raju, Babu Antony, Urvashi, Rajan P. Dev and Parvathy Jayaram. It was the debut directorial of Sangeeth Sivan.

The lead characters were loosely based on the characters of Mel Gibson and Danny Glover in Lethal Weapon, where Raghuvaran and Sukumaran played the lead roles respectively, while the plot is original.

Plot
An undercover agent, Tony Leous was hired by Kochi police to find some drug dealers. Mohan is also a policeman as part of Narcotic control. Tony raids one of Captain Raju's facilities and recovers smuggled items. This gives a heavy blow to the smugglers. At night, Babu Antony enters Tony house and kills the pet dog. The gundas also enter Sukumaran's house and tie Sukumaran and his family, wearing a mask and telling them to be careful. Raghuvaran wants to get evidence to catch the smugglers. Urvashi, sister of Sukumaran, falls in love with Tony, who seems serious always. Finally, Rajan P. Dev, who lost his son now gets a threatening call from the smugglers to help them smuggle or else his second son also may get converted to a drug addict. Rajan P. Dev tells the whole story of his killed son as a smuggler and drug addict due to the villains. A meeting place was fixed between the villain and Rajan P. Dev. At the meeting area, Raghuvaran records the talks. But the villain finds out Raghuvaran, attacks him and also kills Rajan P. Dev. In the end, at the smuggling area, Raghuvaran finishes all the villains. The film ends with Raghuvaran going in a jeep, smiling with Urvashi.

Cast
Raghuvaran as Tony Leous
Sukumaran as Mohan
Captain Raju as Khalid
Babu Antony
Urvashi as Lakshmi
Mohan Raj
Rajan P. Dev as Jayakumar
Kanakalatha as Geetha
Parvathy Jayaram as Tessy
Devan as Raveendranath
T. P. Madhavan as Settu
Shivaji
Master Badusha as Vineeth
Mahesh as Kishore
Willy as Sub Inspector

Trivia

Vyooham was dubbed into Tamil language as Kaaval Athikari.
Vyooham was Raghuvaran's return to Malayalam after Rugma released in 1983.

References

External links
 

1990 films
Indian crime films
1990s Malayalam-language films
1990s crime films
1990 directorial debut films
Films directed by Sangeeth Sivan